Benning Park is a neighborhood in Columbus, Georgia, just above Fort Benning.

Columbus metropolitan area, Georgia
Neighborhoods in Columbus, Georgia